Inga hispida is a species of plant in the family Fabaceae. It is found only in Brazil.

References

hispida
Flora of Brazil
Vulnerable plants
Taxonomy articles created by Polbot